Konings is a Dutch surname and may refer to:

Ad Konings (b. 1956), Dutch ichthyologist
Anthony Konings (1821–1884), Dutch Catholic priest and Redemptorist professor
Jean Konings (1886–1974), Belgian sprinter
Giovanni Matteo Konings (died 1929), Zimbabwean Catholic prelate

See also:
Koning

Dutch-language surnames